The 1977 All-Ireland Under-21 Hurling Championship was the 14th staging of the All-Ireland Under-21 Hurling Championship since its establishment by the Gaelic Athletic Association in 1964.

Cork were the defending champions.

On 9 October 1977, Kilkenny won the championship following a 2-9 to 1-9 defeat of Cork in the All-Ireland final. This was their third All-Ireland title in the under-21 grade and their first in two championship seasons.

Results

Leinster Under-21 Hurling Championship

Final

Munster Under-21 Hurling Championship

First round

Semi-finals

Final

All-Ireland Under-21 Hurling Championship

Semi-finals

Final

References

Under
All-Ireland Under-21 Hurling Championship